The Traffic Management Act 2004 (c 18) is an Act of the Parliament of the United Kingdom. It sets out how road networks should be managed by local authorities and includes regulations for roadworks.  The Act has been implemented from 1 April 2008 across the United Kingdom.

Part 2 - Network Management
This section sets out the network management duty to "secure the expeditious movement of traffic".

Part 4 - Street Works
All the parties interested in occupying streets/highways need to follow the specified guidelines. The main highlights are as follows:
Effective communication between highway authorities and parties interested in carrying out street work
Powers given to highway authorities to impose fixed charges in case of any failure to follow the guidelines
Disciplined approach and advance communication to plan the street works
Introduction of web services for communication
Introduction of Level 3 National Street Gazetteer data
Explicit provision of cancelling/correcting or reverting the work status.

The second wave of the Traffic Management Act 2004 aims to implement permit regulation. As part of this regulation work undertakers have to apply for a permit to work on a street. Undertaker have to discuss and agree the restriction on work timing, apparatus etc. with highway authorities. The highway authorities should approve/reject the application after verifying the permit conditions.

Part 7

Section 99 - Commencement, transitionals and savings
The following orders have been made under this section:
The Traffic Management Act 2004 (Commencement No. 1 and Transitional Provision) (England) Order 2004 (S.I. 2004/2380 (C. 102))
The Traffic Management Act 2004 (Commencement No. 2) (England) Order 2004 (S.I. 2004/3110 (C. 130))
The Traffic Management Act 2004 (Commencement No. 3) (England) Order 2006 (S.I. 2006/1736 (C. 60))
The Traffic Management Act 2004 (Commencement No. 4 and Transitional Provisions) (England) Order 2007 (S.I. 2007/1890 (C. 71))
The Traffic Management Act 2004 (Commencement No. 5 and Transitional Provisions) (England) Order 2007 (S.I. 2007/2053 (C. 78))
The Traffic Management Act 2004 (Commencement No. 5 and Transitional Provisions) (England) (Amendment) Order 2008 (S.I. 2008/757 (C. 35))
The Traffic Management Act 2004 (Commencement No. 6) (England) Order 2007 (S.I. 2007/3184 (C. 131))
The Traffic Management Act 2004 (Commencement No. 1) (Wales) Order 2006 (S.I. 2006/2826 (W. 249) (C. 97))
The Traffic Management Act 2004 (Commencement No. 2 and Transitional Provisions) (Wales) Order 2007 (S.I. 2007/3174 (W. 279))
The Traffic Management Act 2004 (Commencement No. 3) (Wales) Order 2009 (S.I. 2009/1095 (W. 98))

References
Halsbury's Statutes,

External links

United Kingdom Acts of Parliament 2004
2004 in transport